90210 may refer to

Beverly Hills, California, the main city of ZIP code 90210
Beverly Hills Post Office, an adjacent section of Los Angeles that also uses ZIP code 90210
Peltola, Oulu, Finland (postal code 90210)
Beverly Hills, 90210 (franchise), a series of television programs that share common settings
Beverly Hills, 90210, the first television series in the series that ran between 1990 and 2000
90210 (TV series), the fourth series in the Beverly Hills, 90210 franchise that ran from 2008 to 2013
Soundtrack 90210, soundtrack to U.S. television show, released in October 2008
BH90210, a 2019 reboot including the original cast set in a heightened reality
Dr. 90210, a reality television series that started in 2004
High Maintenance 90210, a reality television series that premiered in January 2007
Transylvania 90210: Songs of Death, Dying, and the Dead, an album by Wednesday 13
"90210", a song by Blackbear
"90210" (song), by Travis Scott (2015)